USNS Impeccable (T-AGOS-23) is an Impeccable-class ocean surveillance ship acquired by the U.S. Navy in 2001 and assigned to Military Sealift Command's Special Missions Program.

Construction
Impeccable was built by American Shipbuilding, Tampa, Florida. The contract was awarded on 28 March 1991. The ship's keel was laid down on 15 March 1992, but the Tampa shipyards went bankrupt by November 1993. On 3 December 1992, the General Accounting Office published a report that concluded that T-AGOS 24–27 should not be built. Shortly afterwards the government decided to discontinue this class of ships, but Impeccable was to be completed as the sole ship in her class. The hull was towed to Gulfport, Mississippi, in 1995 where she was finished by Halter Marine Inc. She was launched on 28 August 1998 and was delivered to the Navy on 22 March 2001 which assigned her to the Military Sealift Command (MSC) Special Missions Program.

Design
The ship is a designated T-AGOS vessel built to tow a Surveillance Towed Array Sensor System. The ship's catamaran-type small waterplane area twin hull (SWATH) design prevents the vessel from rolling in heavy seas and gives additional deck space for storing the acoustic equipment.

Mission
The mission of Impeccable is to directly support the Navy by using SURTASS passive and active low frequency sonar arrays to detect and track undersea threats.

Operational history

Low Frequency Active Sonar

The SURTASS Low Frequency Active Sonar system, onboard Impeccable, commenced sea trials in late February 2004. During the spring and summer of 2004, Impeccable conducted five training missions in the Philippine Sea and the northwest Pacific Ocean. All LFA sonar operations included the operation of the High Frequency / Marine Mammal Mitigation sonar and compliance with all mitigation requirements.
 Total operational days on board the Impeccable using the LFA array:
(15 August 2003 to 15 August 2004) 26.2 days with 63.0 hours of transmissions
(15 August 2004 to 15 August 2005) 9.4 days with 22.7 hours of transmissions
(15 August 2005 to 15 August 2006) 22.5 days with 39.4 hours of transmissions.
The ship had five years of active and passive operations in the Western Pacific before the incident in the South China Sea.

South China Sea incidents

On 5 March 2009, the Impeccable was in the South China Sea monitoring submarine activity when it was approached by a People's Liberation Army Navy (PLAN) frigate, which crossed its bow at a range of approximately 100 yards without first making contact. The frigate then crossed Impeccables bow again, this time at a range of approximately 400–500 yards.

On 7 March, a Chinese intelligence ship contacted the Impeccable over bridge-to-bridge radio, calling her operations illegal and directing Impeccable to leave the area or "suffer the consequences."

The Impeccable sprayed water at one of the nearest Chinese ships; the Chinese sailors stripped down to their underwear and their vessel closed in to within 25 feet of the American ship. Shortly after the incident, the Impeccable radioed the Chinese crews, informing them of its intentions to leave the area, and requesting a safe pass to travel. When it was trying to leave the area, the two Chinese trawlers dropped pieces of wood in the Impeccables path and stopped directly in front of it, forcing it to do an emergency stop to avoid a collision. Once the Impeccable got under way, the crew aboard one of the trawlers used a grappling hook to try to snag Impeccable's towed sonar array.

The United States lodged formal protests following the incident, stating that under international law, the U.S. military can conduct activities "in waters beyond the territorial sea of another state without prior notification or consent" including in an exclusive economic zone of another country. "The unprofessional maneuvers by Chinese vessels violated the requirement under international law to operate with due regard for the rights and safety of other lawful users of the ocean." China's Foreign Ministry responded that the Pentagon's complaints that five Chinese vessels had harassed the Impeccable were "totally inaccurate", although this claim was disputed by several released reports, which all state that the Impeccable was interfered with numerous times, both while operating in the area and when attempting to leave.

On 12 March 2009, U.S. President Barack Obama gave the go-ahead to send the guided missile destroyer  to the South China Sea to protect the Impeccable while operating in that area.

Hans M. Kristensen of the Federation of American Scientists has suggested that the incident may be related to the classified Type 093 submarine that the Chinese navy had recently deployed in the area.

Views on the legality of US and Chinese actions during these incidents
China and the United States both maintain the rightfulness of their actions based on competing interpretations of the United Nations Convention on the Law of the Sea.

The United States maintains that the Convention, which it has signed, but not yet ratified, authorizes activities such as those undertaken by Impeccable. Several legal experts also state that there is no legal foundation for China's claim that it can prevent foreign naval vessels from operating within its Exclusive Economic Zone. For example, Raul Pedrozo, writing in the Chinese Journal of International Law, concludes that "all nations may legitimately engage in military activities in foreign exclusive economic zones, without prior notice to, or consent of, the coastal State concerned." On the contrary, Chinese officials assert that the operations are illegal. Rear Admiral Wang Dengping, political commissar of the Armament Department of the Chinese Navy, condemned the Impeccable's activities, stating that "Innocent passage by naval vessels from other countries in the Territorial waters in the Special Economic Zone is acceptable, but not allowed otherwise" under the Convention. Chinese actions were further defended by Professor Ji Guoxing of Shanghai Jiao Tong University who, writing in China Security, maintained that under the Convention, navigation rights in coastal countries' exclusive economic zones are "subject to the resource-related and environment-related laws and regulations of the coastal state," and China could exclude the Impeccable on this basis. Ji further asserted that the Convention's prohibition against gathering military intelligence in another country's territorial waters should be interpreted to also prohibit intelligence gathering in coastal countries' exclusive economic zones.

2015 rescue at sea
On July 19, 2015 while en route for a scheduled port visit to Subic Bay, USNS Impeccable (T-AGOS 23) rescued 11 fishermen. Impeccable sailors spotted personnel on a partially submerged ship and noted debris in the water. "They [Impeccable crew] initially spotted only eight people on the partially submerged vessel," said Lt. Cory Hilgart, the theater anti-submarine watch officer at Commander, Task Force 74. "They then realized that it was actually 11 and made the call to commence the rescue effort." The Impeccables master immediately deemed assistance was required and began preparations to deploy their rigid hull inflatable boat (RHIB) to rescue the personnel. "This was a team effort with civilian mariners, SECDET [security detachment], MILDET [military detachment] and Lockheed Martin working together to achieve an efficient rescue of all 11 fishermen," said Robert Wiechert, Master of the Impeccable. The RHIB made three trips to the distressed vessel and recovered all eleven individuals. "One of the crew members spoke English," said Hilgart. "He told the Impeccable crew that they were fishermen from the Subic Bay region. He confirmed that there were only 11 on board." Once the mariners were brought aboard Impeccable, they were examined by medical personnel and given food and water. No serious injuries or illnesses were reported. Shortly after Impeccable arrived in port in Subic Bay, July 20, the mariners were turned over to the Philippine Coast Guard.

See also
 Code for Unplanned Encounters at Sea
 Hainan Island incident
 New Star ship incident
 Territorial waters
 United Nations Convention on the Law of the Sea

References

External links

 
 Special Mission Program 
 T-AGOS 23 Impeccable at GlobalSecurity.org

 

Small waterplane area twin hull vessels
Ships built in Tampa, Florida
1995 ships
Impeccable-class ocean surveillance ships
Maritime incidents in 2009
International maritime incidents
2009 in the United States
Military catamarans